Gone Kesh is a 2019 Indian Hindi-language comedy drama film written and directed by debutant Qasim Khallow and produced by Dhiraj Ghosh. The film follows the story of a teenage girl who is an aspiring dancer but is diagnosed with alopecia, a condition where she starts losing hair rapidly. It stars Shweta Tripathi and Jitendra Kumar in the lead roles, while Vipin Sharma, Deepika Amin and Brijendra Kala appear in supporting roles. Gone Kesh was released on 29 March 2019.

Cast
 Shweta Tripathi as Enakshi Dasgupta
 Jitendra Kumar as Srijoy 
 Vipin Sharma as A.Dasgupta, Enakshi's father
 Deepika Amin as Debashree Dasgupta, Enakshi's mother
 Brijendra Kala as Alok, wig shop owner
 Bharti Doshi as Enakshi's aunt (mausi)
 Shashi Kiran as Pandit

Reception

Critical response
Renuka Vyavahare of The Times of India gives three and a half stars out of five and says, "Despite the film’s languid pace, this one’s a winner – hair or no hair. It also reminds you that good people end up with good people, always." Hindustan Times rates the film with two and half stars out of five and states "...despite its short-comings, Gone Kesh, is one feeble yet brave attempt." Anupama Chopra of Film Companion gives two and half stars out of five with remarks, "Warm and humorous but may have been better as a short film." and concludes the review as, "Despite the right intentions and strong performances, the sweetness of the story barely lingers." Rahul Desai writing for Film Companion gives three and half stars out of five and finds it, "disarmingly simple and well-acted story that resists the temptation of looking good in order to feel good." Nandini Ramnath of Scroll.in writes, "The parents turn out to be the movie’s most beautiful characters. Vipin Sharma and Deepika Amin turn out solid performances, and movingly portray a couple who have sacrificed their dreams for their only daughter."

Soundtrack

The music of the film is composed by Kanish Sharma, Bharath Hitarth and Bishakh Jyoti while the lyrics are penned by Devendra Kafir, Majaal and Bharath Menaria. The Background Score is composed by Sanchit Choudhary and Bishakh Jyoti

References

External links

 

2010s Hindi-language films
Fiction about diseases and disorders
Indian comedy films
2019 comedy films
2019 films